Notoplax rubiginosa is a species of chiton in the family Acanthochitonidae, native to New Zealand. N. rubiginosa is known as the most common chiton from the Plio-Pleistocene in fossil records of New Zealand.

References

Chitons of New Zealand
rubiginosa
Molluscs described in 1872